Isaac Newton Lewis (October 12, 1858 – November 9, 1931) was a United States Army officer and the inventor of the Lewis gun.

Lewis was born in New Salem, Pennsylvania. He graduated from the United States Military Academy in 1884 and was commissioned second lieutenant in the Second Artillery. Early in his career he made himself an authority on ordnance. In 1900, then-Captain Lewis was sent by Adjutant General Henry Clarke Corbin to Europe to study that subject, his report resulting in the re-armament of the field artillery. By successive promotions, he rose to the rank of colonel in the Coast Artillery Corps in August 1913, and he was retired the next month for disability incurred in line of duty.

In 1911, he refined an original machine gun design of Samuel Maclean and began active marketing of a type which came to be known simply as the "Lewis Gun", which was used in World War I by the Allied armies, the United States Navy, and the airplanes of the United States and Allies. Initially, the United States Army was not interested in his new gun, but after the British and French had bought more than 100,000 for use in the trenches in France, the US Army did purchase them. Lewis, already a wealthy man, declined the royalties—amounting to at least $1,200,000 ($35,557,320 in 2022 terms)—on guns made for the United States after it entered the war.

His other inventions included a time-interval clock and bell system of signals, a replotting and relocating system for coast batteries, an automatic sight, quick-reading mechanical verniers for use in coast defenses, electric car lighting, and windmill electric lighting systems.

He was awarded the Franklin Institute's Elliott Cresson Medal in 1919.

Lewis died of a myocardial infarction at the Lackawanna Railroad terminal in Hoboken, New Jersey, while waiting for a train to his home in Montclair. He is buried at the West Point Cemetery on the grounds of the U.S. Military Academy in West Point, New York.

References

External links
 Biographical sketch with portrait photo

1858 births
1931 deaths
American inventors
People from Montclair, New Jersey
People from New Salem, Pennsylvania
United States Army officers
United States Military Academy alumni
Engineers from Pennsylvania
Engineers from New Jersey
Military personnel from Pennsylvania
Military personnel from New Jersey